Mantle oxidation state (redox state) applies the concept of oxidation state in chemistry to the study of the Earth's mantle. The chemical concept of oxidation state mainly refers to the valence state of one element, while mantle oxidation state provides the degree of decreasing of increasing valence states of all polyvalent elements in mantle materials confined in a closed system. The mantle oxidation state is controlled by oxygen fugacity and can be benchmarked by specific groups of redox buffers.  

Mantle oxidation state changes because of the existence of polyvalent elements (elements with more than one valence state, e.g. Fe, Cr, V, Ti, Ce, Eu, C and others). Among them, Fe is the most abundant (~8 wt% of the mantle) and its oxidation state largely reflects the oxidation state of mantle. Examining the valence state of other polyvalent elements could also provide the information of mantle oxidation state.  

It is well known that the oxidation state can influence the partitioning behavior of elements and liquid water between melts and minerals, the speciation of C-O-H-bearing fluids and melts, as well as transport properties like electrical conductivity and creep.

The formation of diamond requires both reaching high pressures and high temperatures and a carbon source. The most common carbon source in deep Earth is not elemental carbon and redox reactions need to be involved in diamond formation. Examining the oxidation state can help us predict the P-T conditions of diamond formation and elucidate the origin of deep diamonds.

Thermodynamic description of oxidation state 
Mantle oxidation state can be quantified as the oxygen fugacity of the system within the framework of thermodynamics. A higher oxygen fugacity implies a more oxygen-rich and more oxidized environment. At each given pressure-temperature conditions, for any compound or element M that bears the potential to be oxidized by oxygen, we can write

For example, if M is Fe, the redox equilibrium reaction can be Fe+1/2O2=FeO; if M is FeO, the redox equilibrium reaction can be 2FeO+1/2O2=Fe2O3.

Gibbs energy change associated with this reaction is therefore

Along each isotherm, the partial derivation of ΔG with respect to P is ΔV,

.

Combining the 2 equations above,

.

Therefore, 

 (note that ln(e as the base) changed to log(10 as the base) in this formula. 

For a closed system, there might exist more than one of these equilibrium oxidation reactions, but since all these reactions share a same , examining one of them would allow extraction of oxidation state of the system.

Pressure effect on oxygen fugacity 
The physics and chemistry of mantle largely depend on pressure. As mantle minerals are compressed, they are transformed into other minerals at certain depths. Seismic observations of velocity discontinuities and experimental simulations on phase boundaries both verified the structure transformations within the mantle. As such, the mantle can be further divided into three layers with distinct mineral compositions.

Since mantle mineral composition changes, the mineral hosting environment for polyvalent elements also alters. For each layer, the mineral combination governing the redox reactions is unique and will be discussed in detailed below.

Upper mantle 
Between depths of 30 and 60 km, oxygen fugacity is mainly controlled by Olivine-Orthopyroxene-Spinel oxidation reaction.

Under deeper upper mantle conditions, Olivine-Orthopyroxene-Garnet oxygen barometer is the redox reaction that is used to calibrate oxygen fugacity. 

In this reaction, 4 mole of ferrous ions were oxidized to ferric ions and the other 2 mole of ferrous ions remain unchanged.

Transition zone 
Garnet-Garnet reaction can be used to estimate the redox state of transition zone.

A recent study showed that the oxygen fugacity of transition referred from Garnet-Garnet reaction is -0.26  to +3  relative to the Fe-FeO (IW, iron- wütstite) oxygen buffer.

Lower mantle 
Disproportionation of ferrous iron at lower mantle conditions also affect the mantle oxidation state. This reaction is different from the reactions mentioned above as it does not incorporate the participation of free oxygen.

,

FeO resides in the form of ferropericlase (Fp) and Fe2O3 resides in the form of bridgmanite (Bdg). There is no oxygen fugacity change associated with the reaction. However, as the reaction products differ in density significantly, the metallic iron phase could descend downwards to the Earth's core and get separated from the mantle. In this case, the mantle loses metallic iron and becomes more oxidized.

Implications for Diamond Formation 
The equilibrium reaction involving diamond is
.

Examining the oxygen fugacity of the upper mantle and transition enables us to compare it with the conditions (equilibrium reaction shown above) required for diamond formation.

It has also been reported that pH decrease would also facilitate the formation of diamond in Mantle conditions. 

 

 

where the subscript aq means 'aqueous', implying H2 is dissolved in the solution. 

Deep diamonds have become important windows to look into the mineralogy of the Earth's interior. Minerals not stable at the surface could possibly be found within inclusions of superdeep diamonds-- implying they were stable where these diamond crystallized. Because of the hardness of diamonds, the high pressure environment is retained even after transporting to the surface. So far, these superdeep minerals brought by diamonds include ringwoodite, ice-VII,  cubic δ-N2 and Ca-perovskite.

See also 

 Ultra-high-pressure metamorphism

Polymorphism (materials science)

 Table of thermodynamic equations
List of oxidation states of the elements

References

Earth
Geochemistry
Geophysics
High pressure science